The Headless Horseman is a novel by Mayne Reid, first published in monthly serialized form during 1865 and 1866, and subsequently published as a book in 1866, based on the author's adventures in the United States. "The Headless Horseman" or "A Strange Tale of Texas" was set in Texas and based on a south Texas folk tale.

Story 
The Headless Horseman is a story about an Irish adventurer and hero in the War with Mexico.  First Lt. Reid, writing as "Captain Reid," penned a series of popular novels and attributed his headless horseman idea to a south Texas folk tale. Vladimir Nabokov recalled The Headless Horseman as a favorite adventure novel of his childhood years: "which had given him a vision of the prairies and the great open spaces and the overarching sky." At 11, Nabokov even translated The Headless Horseman into French alexandrines.

The story takes place in Texas soon after the War with Mexico. Louise Poindexter, a beautiful newcomer, is courted by two men – the arrogant and vindictive Cassius Calhoun and the dashing but poor mustanger Maurice Gerald. Calhoun plots to eliminate his rival when tragedy strikes: Louise's brother, the young Henry Poindexter, is murdered. All clues point to Maurice Gerald as the assassin. At the same time, a headless rider is spotted in the environs of the Poindexter plantation.

Main characters 
Maurice Gerald: a horse catcher (mustanger), who loves Louise Poindexter
Louise Poindexter: Henry Poindexter's sister, who loves Maurice Gerald
Henry Poindexter: Louise Poindexter's brother, who goes missing
Captain Cassius Calhoun: Louise and Henry Poindexter's cousin
Zebulon "Zeb" Stump: a hunter and Maurice Gerald's friend
Phelim O'Neill: Maurice Gerald's servant and foster brother
Woodley Poindexter: the father of Henry and Louise Poindexter
Isidora: a Mexican who loved Maurice Gerald
Miguel Diaz: a Mexican who hates Maurice and loved Isidora

Origins of the novel 
The novel was reportedly inspired by Creed Taylor's (1820–1906) true story of El Muerto, the Headless Horseman. Taylor was a veteran of the Texas Revolution, the War with Mexico, the Civil War and an Indian fighter, who was also involved in the Sutton–Taylor feud, once considered the state's longest and deadliest feud.

Historian J. Warren Hunter, through his discussions with Taylor, learned a lot of Texas history firsthand at the Taylor home in Kimble County.  Among the many recollections Taylor conveyed to Hunter, was a particularly outrageous one which involved his cronies, Alexander Anderson "Bigfoot" Wallace and John McPeters.

Taylor claimed the event occurred in 1848.  By then, Wallace, a survivor of the doomed Mier Expedition, had become a famed Indian fighter.  Although McPeters fought at San Jacinto, he is almost forgotten today.  During the War with Mexico, both men were Texas Rangers commanded by the fierce Mabry "Mustang" Gray (1817–1848).

As Creed's story appears in Hunter's 1898 manuscript, The Life of Creed Taylor; Bigfoot and McPeters tracked and killed a number of Mexican horse thieves near the Nueces, south of present-day Uvalde.  Wallace decided to use the ringleader's body as a warning to others. Bigfoot decapitated the dead man, called Vuavis or Vidal, and the two put his body on a wild stallion that the two had caught and tied between two trees.  They thrust his head into his sombrero, secured by a strap and tied to the pommel of the saddle.  Then they set the horse loose to roam the hilly countryside.

Creed didn't place himself in the story, but did know the horse thief who had lost his head.  One of Taylor's friends, Bate Berry, captured Lt. Vuavis during the Siege of Bexar (December 1835).  Creed watched as Vuavis, who had deserted, willingly spilled all his Mexican military info to Berry, who had a reputation for scalping enemies.  They finally released the shaken captive.

Years later, Vuavis, alias "Vidal," and his gang began terrorizing south Texas ranchers and stealing their cattle.  It was then that Bigfoot and McPeters got on his trail, and shortened his career.  Travelers and soldiers at Fort Inge near Uvalde soon were reporting sightings of a wily headless rider.

Various narratives 
The original story spawned various retellings.  After Mayne Reid, James T. DeShields was the next interpreter.  A dry-goods salesman, he was known for one novel, Cynthia Ann Parker.  DeShields wrote pieces for the "Fort Worth Press" based on material he bought from old Texans; and his sometimes exaggerated articles were presented as factual.

In 1906, J. Warren Hunter sold his Taylor interview manuscript to DeShields, who lightly rewrote parts.  21 years after Hunter's death, he published Tall Men with Long Rifles, an account of Taylor's adventures in the Texas Revolution.

In 1924, J. Warren Hunter's son, J. Marvin Hunter (editor of Frontier Times), took his turn.  He personalized crimes of Vidal's rustlers, who were now stealing horses from Creed Taylor.  The younger Hunter vividly sketched events, while changing the time to 1850, the year of a sweeping Indian raid that drained frontier manpower, leaving few defenders against bandits.  John McPeters disappeared from the narrative altogether.  The younger Hunter declared that Capt. Reid's novel was based on fact.

Folklorist J. Frank Dobie changed the tale in his 1928 Tales of Old Time Texas, suggesting the headless rider was once a "ghostly guard of the mine of the long-abandoned Candelaria Mission on the Nueces to protect it from profane prospectors".

In 2022, screenwriter Alcario Cary Cadena wrote, "El Muerto: Texas Headless Horseman", his feature length script. In the same year he produced a short film with the same title.

Adaptations 
The Headless Horseman, a 1972 Soviet-Cuban co-production film directed by Vladimir Vajnshtok and starring Ludmila Savelyeva and Oleg Vidov.

El Muerto; Texas Headless Horseman, a 2022 short film directed and written by Alcario Cary Cadena. Film starred Santiago Villalobos, Aileen Corpos, Michael Cristian, Mario Aguilar, Felipe Martinez, Nathan Hodgkins, and Alcario Cary Cadena.

References

External links 
 
 

Novels by Mayne Reid
Irish-American novels
Novels set in Texas
American novels adapted into films
Novels first published in serial form
American adventure novels
Western (genre) novels